An aldol condensation is a condensation reaction in organic chemistry in which two carbonyl moieties (of aldehydes or ketones) react to form a β-hydroxyaldehyde or β-hydroxyketone (an aldol reaction), and this is then followed by dehydration to give a conjugated enone. The overall reaction is as follows (where the Rs can be H):

Aldol condensations are important in organic synthesis and biochemistry as ways to form carbon–carbon bonds. 

In its usual form, it involves the nucleophilic addition of a ketone enolate to an aldehyde to form a β-hydroxy ketone, or "aldol" (aldehyde + alcohol), a structural unit found in many naturally occurring molecules and pharmaceuticals.

The term aldol condensation is also commonly used, especially in biochemistry, to refer to just the first (addition) stage of the process—the aldol reaction itself—as catalyzed by aldolases. However, this is formally an addition reaction rather than a condensation reaction because it does not involve the loss of a small molecule.

Mechanism

The first part of this reaction is an aldol reaction, the second part a dehydration—an elimination reaction (Involves removal of a water molecule or an alcohol molecule). Dehydration may be accompanied by decarboxylation when an activated carboxyl group is present. The aldol addition product can be dehydrated via two mechanisms; a strong base like potassium t-butoxide, potassium hydroxide or sodium hydride deprotonates the product to an enolate, which eliminates via the E1cB mechanism, while dehydration in acid proceeds via an E1 reaction mechanism. Depending on the nature of the desired product, the aldol condensation may be carried out under two broad types of conditions: kinetic control or thermodynamic control. 
 :

Crossed aldol condensation 

A crossed aldol condensation is a result of two dissimilar carbonyl compounds containing α-hydrogen(s) undergoing aldol condensation. Ordinarily, this leads to four possible products as either carbonyl compound can act as the nucleophile and self-condensation is possible, which makes a synthetically useless mixture. However, this problem can be avoided if one of the compounds does not contain an α-hydrogen, rendering it non-enolizable. In an aldol condensation between an aldehyde and a ketone, the ketone acts as the nucleophile, as its carbonyl carbon does not possess high electrophilic character due to the +I effect and steric hindrance. Usually, the crossed product is the major one. Any traces of the self-aldol product from the aldehyde may be disallowed by first preparing a mixture of a suitable base and the ketone and then adding the aldehyde slowly to the said reaction mixture. Using too concentrated base could lead to a competing Cannizzaro reaction.

Condensation types 

It is important to distinguish the aldol condensation from other addition reactions of carbonyl compounds.
 When the base is an amine and the active hydrogen compound is sufficiently activated the reaction is called a Knoevenagel condensation.
 In a Perkin reaction the aldehyde is aromatic and the enolate generated from an anhydride.
 Claisen-Schmidt condensation between an aldehyde or ketone having an α-hydrogen with an aromatic carbonyl compound lacking an α-hydrogen.
 A Claisen condensation involves two ester compounds.
 A Dieckmann condensation involves two ester groups in the same molecule and yields a cyclic molecule
 A Henry reaction involves an aldehyde and an aliphatic nitro compound.
 A Robinson annulation involves an α,β-unsaturated ketone and a carbonyl group, which first engage in a Michael reaction prior to the aldol condensation. 
 In the Guerbet reaction, an aldehyde, formed in situ from an alcohol, self-condenses to the dimerized alcohol.
 In the Japp–Maitland condensation water is removed not by an elimination reaction but by a nucleophilic displacement

Examples
In the Aldox process developed by Royal Dutch Shell and Exxon, converts propene and syngas to 2-ethylhexanol via hydroformylation to butyraldehyde, aldol condensation to 2-ethylhexenal and finally hydrogenation.

Pentaerythritol is produced on a large scale beginning with crossed aldol condensation of acetaldehyde and three equivalents of formaldehyde to give pentaerythrose, which is further reduced in a Cannizzaro reaction.

Scope 
Ethyl 2-methylacetoacetate and campholenic aldehyde react in an Aldol condensation. The synthetic procedure is typical for this type of reaction. In the process, in addition to water, an equivalent of ethanol and carbon dioxide are lost in decarboxylation.

Ethyl glyoxylate 2 and glutaconate (diethyl-2-methylpent-2-enedioate) 1 react to isoprenetricarboxylic acid 3 (isoprene (2-methylbuta-1,3-diene) skeleton) with sodium ethoxide. This reaction product is very unstable with initial loss of carbon dioxide and followed by many secondary reactions. This is believed to be due to steric strain resulting from the methyl group and the carboxylic group in the cis-dienoid structure.

Occasionally, an aldol condensation is buried in a multistep reaction or in catalytic cycle as in the following example:

In this reaction an alkynal 1 is converted into a cycloalkene 7 with a ruthenium catalyst and the actual condensation takes place with intermediate 3 through 5. Support for the reaction mechanism is based on isotope labeling.

The reaction between menthone ((2S,5R)-2-isopropyl-5-methylcyclohexanone) and anisaldehyde (4-methoxybenzaldehyde) is complicated due to steric shielding of the ketone group. This obstacle is overcome by using a strong base such as potassium hydroxide and a very polar solvent such as DMSO in the reaction below:

The product can epimerize by way of a common intermediate—enolate A—to convert between the original (S,R) and the (R,R) epimers. The (R,R) product is insoluble in the reaction solvent whereas the (S,R) is soluble. The precipitation of the (R,R) product drives the epimerization equilibrium reaction to form this as the major product.

See also
 Organic reaction and chemical reaction
 The Auwers synthesis
Reformatsky reaction

References

External links 
Organic Chemistry Portal

Condensation reactions
Carbon-carbon bond forming reactions